Illingen is a municipality in the district of Neunkirchen, in Saarland, Germany. It is situated approximately 10 km northwest of Neunkirchen, and 17 km northeast of Saarbrücken.

Overview
Since 1974, the villages of Illingen, Hirzweiler, Hüttigweiler, Uchtelfangen, Welschbach and Wustweiler have been part of the Illingen community.

Illingen is a large, well maintained village with a pleasant castle complex, including a small modern Hotel with restaurant. The village St. Stephan church is very old and worth a visit. There are two train stops (Illingen and Gennweiler). Trains travel in the direction of Saarbrücken to the south and Lebach-Jabach to the north. The earliest written documentation which exists about Illingen is from the late 9th century.  The Freiherr von Kerpen lived in the castle until the late 19th century.

Gallery

Notable people 

 Peter Müller (born 1955), politician (CDU)

External links

 Gemeinde Illingen

References

Neunkirchen (German district)